Fidel Daniel Ambríz González (born 21 March 2003) is a Mexican professional footballer who plays as a defensive midfielder for Liga MX club León.

Club career

Club León
Born in León, Guanajuato, Ambríz began his career with León, joining the team's youth academy. He made his Liga MX debut on 9 November 2019 against Toluca in a 4–0 victory.

International career
Ambríz was called up to the under-20 side by Luis Ernesto Pérez to participate at the 2021 Revelations Cup, captaining in all three matches, where Mexico won the competition. The following year, he was named captain for the under-20 side that would participate at the 2022 CONCACAF U-20 Championship in order to participate at the FIFA U-20 World Cup and Olympics. Mexico failed to qualify following a quarter-final defeat to Guatemala.

Career statistics

Club

Honours
León
Liga MX: Guardianes 2020
Leagues Cup: 2021

Mexico U20
Revelations Cup: 2021, 2022

References

2003 births
Living people
Mexican footballers
Association football midfielders
Club León footballers
Liga MX players
Footballers from Guanajuato
Sportspeople from León, Guanajuato
Mexico under-20 international footballers